Marcantonio Colonna was the name of at least three ships of the Italian Navy named in honour of Marcantonio Colonna and may refer to:

 Italian battleship Marcantonio Colonna, a  laid down in 1915 but broken up on the slip in 1921..
 , a  launched in 1927 and broken up in 1943.
 , a  

Italian Navy ship names